Gradski vrt Hall is a multi-purpose indoor arena in Osijek, Croatia. The complex is used mostly for handball and basketball matches. The complex has 7 main halls, two of them with spectator seats, bigger one capacity of 3,538 (4,438 basketball configuration) and a smaller one 1,770, there are two more smaller halls for fighting sports training. The complex also contains the biggest indoor track and field compound in Croatia. It was also used as one of the venues during the 2009 World Men's Handball Championship. In 2017 the venue hosted the 2017 Davis Cup World Group first round between Croatia and Spain.

Building levels
Ground level – Level ± 0,00 (Halls A, C, D, G, H, saunas, swimming pool, locker rooms, sanitary facilities, sport medicine, shops, coffee bars, technical support, staff, etc.)
1st Level – Level +5,00 (Hall B, sport club premises, V.I.P., press, coffee shop, entrance hall, galleries, sanitary facilities etc.)
2nd Level – Level +9,00 (Track and field tunnel (F), technical support, staff, etc.)
3rd Level – Level +12,00 (Sport commentator gallery, TV, technical support)

The gross surface of entire complex is 18,590 m2.

Dimensions
Big hall (A – 35x50 m)
Smaller halls (C, D – 2 x 22x16 m)
Gym (G – 10.25x9.6 m)
Aerobic and fitness (H – 9.2x9.6 m) and saunas with a small swimming pool (18.5x10.6 m) locker rooms, sanitary facilities, sport medicine, doping control etc., are placed on the ground level ±0,00.
Basketball hall (B – 30x32+10 m) 
Track and field tunnel (F – 87x16 m)

Except sport events this complex host all kind of entertainment, cultural and media events as well as 
expos.

See also
 List of indoor arenas in Croatia
 List of indoor arenas in Europe

References

External links

Indoor arenas in Croatia
Handball venues in Croatia
Basketball venues in Croatia
Volleyball venues in Croatia
Sports venues completed in 2008
Sports venues in Osijek